Alfred Mathias Grønneberg (born 26 January 1879) was a Norwegian politician.

He was born in Tjølling to farmers Andreas Grønneberg and Inger Marie Valle, and settled as watchmaker in Fredrikstad from 1907.
He was elected representative to the Storting for the period 1937–1945, for the Conservative Party. He was a member of the municipal council of Fredrikstad from 1922 to 1934. He chaired Norges Urmakerforbund from 1930 to 1941.

References

1879 births
Year of death missing
People from Larvik
Østfold politicians
Conservative Party (Norway) politicians
Members of the Storting
Norwegian watchmakers (people)